The 2016 Butler Bulldogs football team represented Butler University in the 2016 NCAA Division I FCS football season. They were led by 11th-year head coach Jeff Voris and played their home games at the Butler Bowl. They were members of the Pioneer Football League. They finished the season 4–7, 2–6 in PFL play to finish in a two-way tie for ninth place.

Schedule

Source: Schedule

Game summaries

at Indiana State

Franklin

at Taylor

at Campbell

San Diego

Marist

at Davidson

Dayton

at Valparaiso

Morehead State

at Drake

References

Butler
Butler Bulldogs football seasons
Butler Bulldogs football